The Sunnyslope community is an established neighborhood within the borders of the city of Phoenix, Arizona. The geographic boundaries are 19th Avenue to the west, Cactus Road to the north, 7th Street to the east, and Northern Avenue to the south. The Sunnyslope community is included in parts of three zip code areas: 85020, 85021 and 85029.

After four failed attempts to become its own city, Sunnyslope was annexed into the city of Phoenix in 1959. While it exists in the middle of a large metropolitan area, the Sunnyslope community prides itself on a small-town feel and distinct cultural identity.

"Sunny Slope" founder

Sunnyslope is known for having been settled by poor tuberculants who spent their last money traveling west for the drier climate and cleaner air, but the  subdivision called “Sunny Slope” was first platted by architect William R. Norton in 1911.

Norton was born on October 25, 1853, in the state of Massachusetts. He moved to San Francisco, California where he met and married Mary Emma. There he became a prominent architect. However, while living in California, his health began to deteriorate. In 1891, he moved to Phoenix, Arizona believing that the dry air and sunshine would benefit his health. Norton designed the Carnegie Library, the city's first library, and the Gila County Courthouse in Globe, Arizona. In 1895, he built a house on Washington Street and in 1907 the rest of his family joined him in Phoenix.

Norton began to invest in large open tracts in the desert and platted "Sunny Slope." He and his family eventually moved to the area and built a home there. Reportedly, one of his daughters looked at the sun shining on the area's rolling Phoenix mountains and exclaimed, "What a pretty, sunny slope!" Inspired by the phrase, Mr. Norton named the area Sunny Slope. Norton died in 1938 from the injuries which he received in an auto-pedestrian accident. He was buried in Phoenix's Greenwood/Memory Lawn Mortuary & Cemetery.

Sunnyslope
The name appeared as two words until after World War II when it was combined into one word. The Sunnyslope Subdivision's original boundaries were from Central Avenue on the west, to Dunlap Avenue on the north and from 3rd Street on east to Alice on the south. By 1919, Sunnyslope was a natural desert area with only four or five cottages surrounded by cactus and sagebrush.

With no irrigation north of the Arizona Canal, the Sunnyslope desert was a very dry area and was considered to be a good place to live for people recovering from tuberculosis or asthma. During this period, it was common for people from eastern states, known as “health seekers,” to move to Arizona.

Many of these people built tent houses or small cottages, planning to get well and then return to their former homes. Others, having spent their last dimes to move west in search of health, pitched tents or slept on porches. There were no roads or electricity.

Desert Mission and Angels of the Desert
 
Marguerite and William Albert Colley were the second permanent residents of Sunnyslope after purchasing five acres for $100 per acre near 3rd Street and Townley.

They had come to the desert in 1919 for their son's health. Marguerite was a practical nurse and a social worker. She soon began visiting her sick neighbors bringing food and aide to their bedsides. She met Elizabeth Beatty who was also providing help for those suffering from tuberculosis or asthma.

Sunnyslope neighbors looked forward to and welcomed the visits of Elizabeth Beatty and Marguerite Colley and these ladies soon became known as the “Angels of the Desert.”

In 1927, the Desert Mission was established. This was a facility – a comprehensive, faith-based community center — that provided for the medical, social, and religious needs of the people living in the community. In 1936, there were approximately 600 residents in Sunny Slope. There was still much vacant land, covered with vegetation and cacti.
 
In the late 1940s, after World War II, the population of the community expanded tremendously. Many small businesses, churches and schools were established. The first school, Sunnyslope Elementary School, was opened in 1949, Mountain View Elementary School was opened in 1952, and the third elementary school built in Sunnyslope was Desert View which opened in 1956. Sunnyslope High School opened in 1953.

As the neighborhood grew, the medical functions of the Desert Mission became a separate entity by the 1950s, later known as the John C. Lincoln Health Network, and now known as "HonorHealth"  (after a 2013 merger with Scottsdale Healthcare). Its 266-bed Sunnyslope flagship hospital is now one of eight Level I trauma facilities in Arizona. The Desert Mission remains in operation as a subsidiary of this healthcare group. Through its food bank, children's dental clinic, community health center, behavioral health clinic and a licensed and accredited child care facility, the Desert Mission continues to respond to the needs of Sunnyslope and North Phoenix.

John C. Lincoln, an Ohio inventor and industrialist who founded Lincoln Electric, relocated to the Sunnyslope district in 1931 with his wife Helen, to treat her tuberculosis; almost immediately, the Lincolns became major financial supporters of Desert Mission and took on key leadership roles in the organization for most of the remainder of their lives. Helen Lincoln lived to the age of 102, after having been given just two more years to live by doctors.

In 1946, Charles and Lillian Stough founded "Sand" a biweekly newspaper. It was Sunnyslope's first newspaper. In 1950, the newspaper was sold and incorporated into the Sunnyslope Journal. In 1956, The Stough family resumed publishing and named their paper "Sage".

The King of Sunnyslope

Dr. Kenneth E. Hall was a native of Oklahoma who lived in Sunnyslope during the 1940s. Hall considered himself the “King of Sunnyslope” and built the biggest house in Sunnyslope. Hall, considered by his peers as controversial, operated the North Mountain Hospital, a 40-bed hospital in Sunnyslope, which he built in 1955. The hospital had a primate zoo located on the hospital grounds. In 1963, he illegally diverted $16,564 in government funds to help in the construction of El Cid Castle, a bowling alley which resembled a Moorish Castle.

Hall had been performing unsanctioned medical operations, and his physician's license was revoked in 1971 after four patients died during gastric bypass surgery. In 1974, he pleaded guilty to diverting thousands of dollars in government funds to help build the castle. Hall was bankrupt, and in 1982, El Cid Castle bowling alley, which took 20 years to build, closed after only one year of operation. Hall lost the building in order to settle a malpractice suit. Hall died in 2001.  His son, Walter Eugene Hall, was convicted of child molestation and aggravated sexual assault in 2007.

The Sunnyslope Rock Garden

The Sunnyslope Rock Garden was the creation of Grover Cleveland Thompson, a retired heavy-machinery operator, who moved to Sunnyslope in 1952. He purchased a property and had a house built on 13th Place (now 10023 N. 13th Place).  Thompson began making his artistic creations using various objects, such as Halloween masks, as molds. Thompson died in 1976 and his residence and garden abandoned until 1979 when Marion Blake, a local teacher purchased it.
 
Thompson's creations have been documented and cataloged by the Smithsonian American Art Museum.  Upon her retirement, Blake gave the garden to the University of Arizona.

Microclimate 
The Sunnyslope area has a known microclimate around the Royal Palm Park area at 15th Ave and Butler, where the temperatures can be 3-4 degrees cooler than other areas within Phoenix.

Annexation
Sunnyslope attempted to be incorporated as its own town on four occasions but failed each time. In 1959, the City of Phoenix annexed the community of Sunnyslope along with many other valley areas. These areas eventually became part of the City of Phoenix, but Sunnyslope has always retained its identity.

Crime rates
In 2011, Sunnyslope zipcode 85021 had above average risks for automotive theft at 473, 211 for burglary, 167 for personal crime risk and 259 for property crime compared to 100 represented as the national average.
Zip code 85020 had 358 for automotive theft, burglary 179, personal crime 170, and 222 for property crime.

Home prices
The median home cost in Sunnyslope area zip code 85021 is $172,200 and in 85020 (zip 85020) is $173,900.

Sunnyslope High School 
Sunnyslope High School is located at 35 W. Dunlap Avenue, Phoenix 85021. In 1953 it became part of the Glendale Union High School District and enrolls nearly 2,000 students. The high school boasts high marks in education, award-winning sports teams, and various extra-curricular activities. Sunnsylope is part of the College Board's 2013 National Advanced Placement District of the Year and is regularly listed on U.S. News & World Report's Best High School Ranking list.

Emerging Sunnyslope Music Scene 
Several record labels, record stores and recording studios are contributing an emerging music scene in the Sunnyslope community.

Fervor Records
Founded in 1990, Fervor Records has operated out of Sunnyslope since 1991. The initial goal was to unite the local music community while helping the homeless. Originally operating under the non-profit Central Arizona Shelter Services, the label's first release “Southwest Holiday” was a multi-genre, multi-artist compilation of Christmas music. The release sold over 4000 units in 6 weeks with all proceeds donated to Central Arizona Shelter Services. Fervor Records was originally located in a small strip mall at 600 W Dunlap but has since moved into three houses behind The American Indian College campus. Fervor Records is owned and operated by David Hilker (one of the original founders) and Jeff Freundlich. The label has both local and national artists on their roster. The company also owns a large re-issue catalog of vintage recordings dating back to the 1920s.

Slope Records
Longtime Sunnyslope resident, Thomas Lopez, founded Slope Records in 2015. Originally started as hobby, the business has evolved into a full-fledged label featuring local and national Punk bands, and an array of punk re-issues. Slope Records is located at 11430 N. Cave Creek Rd, Sunnyslope, AZ 85020.

Onus Records
Onus Records is a virtual label located in Sunnyslope with its stated mission to “Make music, not money.” Onus claims to be the only non-profit music label in the nation. Founder Tommy Globbot tells the story that his grandfather Viral created the music label in 1972, but it officially began operating in 2014 and is affiliated with freelance music journalist Serene Dominic.

Casa Butthole Record Collective
CBRC is a Sunnyslope record label working to diversify the Phoenix music scene by supporting musicians of color and other underrepresented artists. The label was founded by Josue Rodriguez and Paris Tejas with their studio located in their Sunnyslope home near Cave Creek Road. The collective offers a pay-what-you-can pricing plan, and offers its members access to a lo-fi recording studio and the ability to produce cassettes.

3 Leaf Post Recording 
3 Leaf Recording is a full-service recording studio on Hatcher Road in Sunnyslope. The studio focuses on recording music but also offers audio for commercials, videos, and television shows. Address: 307 Hatcher Road, Phoenix, Arizona 85021.

Crates Records and Gear 
Crates, Records and Gear was founded in 2016 by Sergio Sanchez and is located at 8841 N. Central Ave, Phoenix, AZ 85020. The business includes a record store and barbershop. Crates also operates a full recording studio from the location. Owners Sergio and Todd broadcast a live “Crates Radio” radio show on KDIF 102.9 FM, it is also available as a podcast.

Music Video Recording Spaces
https://www.peerspace.com/ is a powerful platform to find local spaces to rent for artists interested in creating videos for their art. One space in Sunnyslope is UniquelyRochelles operating her midcentury home for artists creating RnB, and hip hop style content for their community. Started as a service in 2020 amidst the Covid Pandemic.

Today
The population of Sunnyslope represents the most diverse socio-economic neighborhoods of Phoenix.  Many of the wealthiest and most politically active persons (past mayors, councilmembers, and business leaders) in the valley and many of the most financially vulnerable in the Phoenix area live in Sunnyslope.  John C. Lincoln Health Network, a two-hospital network of primary, specialty, ambulatory, and emergency care providers, grew out of the Desert Mission community medical center. (A 2013 merger with Scottsdale Healthcare resulted in the combined entity being known as HonorHealth by 2015.) John C. Lincoln Health Network is the largest employer of Sunnyslope and the surrounding neighborhoods. Desert Mission Services continues to meet the basic needs of the community through the Desert Mission Food Bank, the Desert Mission Children's Dental Clinic, Desert Mission's Marley House Behavioral Health Clinic, Lincoln Learning Center, a nationally accredited child development and learning facility, and Desert Mission Neighborhood Renewal (a neighborhood-based Community Development Corporation).

In April 2011, Sunnyslope was the featured community for the Modern Phoenix Home Tour, shedding light on the number of prominent architects and other creative individuals who have chosen to develop (and live in) properties in the community.

Gallery of historic Sunnyslope

Notes

See also

List of historic properties in Casa Grande, Arizona
List of historic properties in Chandler, Arizona
List of historic properties in Florence, Arizona
List of historic properties in Glendale, Arizona
List of historic properties in Mesa, Arizona
List of historic properties in Peoria, Arizona
List of historic properties in Phoenix, Arizona
List of historic properties in Tempe, Arizona
El Cid Castle

References

External links
 Sunnyslope History from the Sunnyslope Historical Society and Museum
 Historical Timeline of Sunnyslope by John C. Lincoln Health Network
 There's No Place Like Sunnyslope by The Modern Phoenix Neighborhood Network 

Geography of Phoenix, Arizona
History of Phoenix, Arizona
Populated places in Maricopa County, Arizona